Visual flight or "Visual Attitude Flying" is a method of controlling an aircraft where the aircraft attitude is determined by observing outside visual references.

The remainder of this article is applicable to fixed-wing aircraft; much of it is also relevant to gliders and hang gliders, with the obvious exceptions of any references to engines and power.

For aircraft the primary visual reference used is usually the relationship between the aircraft's "nose" or cowling against the natural horizon.

The pilot can maintain or change the airspeed, altitude, and direction of flight (heading) as well as the rate of climb or rate of descent and rate of turn (bank angle) through the use of the aircraft flight controls and aircraft engine controls to adjust the "sight picture". Some reference to flight instruments is usually necessary to determine exact airspeed, altitude, heading, bank angle and rate of climb/descent.

There are 3 components to the aircraft's attitude. They are pitch, roll and yaw.

Aircraft attitude

Attitude components

see also aircraft attitude

Pitch
Pitch is the vertical relationship between the nose and horizon. Since the pilot / cockpit and nose of the aircraft are all moving together, the pitch attitude is seen as the ratio of visible sky to ground in the view ahead. The exact ratio of sky to ground visible in the forward window will vary from one aircraft type to another. In a typical light aircraft, the ratio might be 2/3 ground and 1/3 sky when the aircraft is in the cruise attitude

Increasing the pitch attitude (nose up) (making more sky visible)
 Airspeed will decrease
 Rate of climb will increase (or rate of descent will decrease)
 Load Factor will increase

Decreasing the pitch attitude (nose down) (making more ground visible)
 Airspeed will increase
 Rate of descent will increase (or rate of climb will decrease)
 Load Factor will decrease

Roll
Roll or bank is how much the nose "tilts" to the left or right. It can also be thought of as the angle the horizon makes in the window. The bank angle ranges from 0 to about 30 degrees under normal circumstances. Larger bank angles are used in aerobatics or air combat. Glider pilots will commonly use bank angles of up to 45 to 60 degrees.

Changing the bank attitude directly affects :
 Bank angle
 Rate of turn

When the aircraft banks, the lift of the wings no longer acts vertically, and so the force directly upwards is reduced (by the cosine of the bank angle). If left uncorrected this will result in the aircraft descending. The nose will also usually drop. In order to maintain level flight the pilot will apply back-pressure to the stick while the wings are banked. This will maintain level flight. The airspeed will usually decrease slightly as a result of this. For steeper bank angles an aircraft pilot will usually increase the power setting to keep the speed up.

Yaw
Yaw refers to the direction in which the nose of the aircraft is pointing. It is the left-right movement of the nose across the horizon. It is possible for the nose of the aircraft to be pointing in a different direction from that in which the aircraft is moving. This usually occurs in a turn, and is called slip (if the aircraft is moving sideways into the turn) or skid (if it is moving outwards). Yaw is almost impossible to detect by visual references. In fixed-wing aircraft it is detected by references to the slip indicator. Gliders usually have a piece of string mounted in the pilot's vision which indicates airflow over the glider, and is called the yaw string.

Attitude types

Cruise attitude

An aircraft is usually designed so that the "horizon/nose sight picture"
that the pilot sees in cruising flight is similar to that seen when the aircraft is on the ground. This will also usually coincide with having the interior floor and passenger compartment in a level attitude. In cruise flight, the aircraft maintains a constant airspeed and altitude, which is the result of a constant pitch attitude and aircraft power setting. A particular aircraft will have a design cruise airspeed at which the plane will be in an essentially level attitude.

When a pilot is undergoing flight training, the cruise attitude is usually one of the first things that they will learn. The sight picture associated with cruise flight, will include the horizon and a combination of sky and ground.

Pitch (nose-up) attitude

To make an aircraft climb, i.e. gain altitude, the pilot will raise the nose higher than it is in the cruise attitude. For many light aircraft, this will correspond to a sight picture where the aircraft nose appears to be on or just slightly above the horizon. The amount of movement will typically not exceed 10-15 degrees.

If the pilot does not adjust the engine power by increasing the throttle setting, the aircraft's airspeed will decrease. The amount of decrease will depend on the amount the nose was raised compared to the cruise attitude, and what the power setting is. When flying light aircraft, power is usually increased to full for any extended climb.

Even if power is increased, the airspeed will still decrease if the pitch attitude is increased beyond a certain point. The amount that the airspeed decreases with increasing pitch attitude (nose up) is aircraft type dependent, and is usually directly related to how much excess power is available and the power setting used.

Types of climb

The pilot controls the rate of climb, and the airspeed during the climb by the combination of the pitch attitude and power setting. He will choose the pitch-power settings according to the amount of altitude gain required or how quickly it is desired to climb, or if a constant airspeed is desired. Every aircraft type has limits on the pitch-power settings that can be used for climbing flight. Typically it is the pitch attitude which is the more limiting factor. Somewhat like an automobile, if the "slope" is made too steep, by an excessive increase (nose up) in pitch-attitude, the aircraft will lack sufficient power to climb, and in an extreme nose-up attitude, the airspeed may decrease to the point where the aircraft will stall. (Some aircraft have a duration limit for a particular power setting)

There are 3 common types of climb:
 Cruise  This is usually used after takeoff when the aircraft has reached a safe height and there is no further urgency to climb. The objective is to combine an adequate climb rate with maximum forward speed. The airspeed will typically be around eighty to ninety percent of cruise speed for a light aircraft.
 Max Rate  The objective is to climb at the greatest rate of altitude gain per unit of time. It is referred to as Vy. Airspeed is typically about double the stall speed for a light aircraft.
 Max Angle  The objective is to climb with the greatest gain of altitude per distance covered over the ground. It is referred to as Vx. Typical airspeeds are usually 150% of stall speed.
 "Zoom climb"  The so-called "zoom climb" is typically used when only a slight amount of altitude gain is required e.g. less than 100 ft (30 m). For this type of climb, the pilot simply increases the pitch attitude (nose up) momentarily without adjusting the power setting, accepting a temporary loss in airspeed.

In light aircraft, full power is typically used when climbing. The type of climb is therefore determined by the pitch attitude. The aircraft's Pilot Operating Handbook (P.O.H.) will list the airspeeds for the various types of climbs. The pilot adjusts the aircraft's pitch attitude to match the speed quoted in the P.O.H. for that particular type of climb desired. While the airspeed indicator is used for precise airspeed control, it is generally fairly easy for an experienced pilot to distinguish the different "look" of the cruise, max-rate, or max-angle climb attitudes when he is familiar with a particular aircraft type. Larger aircraft follow the same principles, the only difference being that full power is not always used, especially at lower altitudes, as the engines are usually powerful enough to create excessive airspeed or engine overheating.

Descent attitude

To make an aircraft descend (i.e. lose altitude), the pilot will lower the nose lower than it was in the cruise attitude. For many light aircraft, this will correspond to a sight picture where the aircraft nose appears to be slightly below the horizon. The actual amount of down movement usually will not exceed about 10 degrees for most normal descents.

If the pilot does not adjust the engine power by decreasing the throttle setting, the aircraft's airspeed will increase. The amount of increase will depend on how much the nose was lowered compared to the cruise attitude, and what the previous power setting was. When flying [light aircraft], power usually is decreased to around 2/3 full for a cruise descent.

Even if power is decreased, the airspeed will still increase if the pitch attitude is decreased (nose down) beyond a certain point. The amount that the airspeed increases with decreasing pitch attitude (nose down) is type dependent, and is usually directly related to how aerodynamically clean the aircraft is. If the airspeed is allowed to increase to or past Vne structural damage can occur.

Takeoff attitude

The takeoff attitude is similar to and for some aircraft, identical to a cruise climb attitude, the takeoff attitude is also needed for helicopters, private jets, rockets and all flying aircraft.

Landing attitude

The landing attitude has 3 actual "sub attitudes" :
 Descent  The descent during the final leg is typically flown at 1.3 times the stall speed of the aircraft, and usually with the flaps extended. Large "airline" (transport) type aircraft, are flown on a 3 degree slope or glidepath. Smaller light aircraft will typically be flown on a 4 to 6 degree glidepath. Typical power settings are 3/4 full power. The rate of descent typically ranges from approximately 300 ft/min (100 m/min) for light aircraft to 700 ft/min (200 m/min) for transport category.
 Roundout  Contacting the runway with a 300 ft/min (100 m/min) descent rate will be extremely uncomfortable and can cause damage to both the aircraft and passengers. For that reason, the aircraft will be put into a roundout attitude shortly before it would otherwise contact the ground. The attitude is similar to the cruise attitude and is accomplished by the pilot increasing the pitch attitude (raising the nose) at approximately ten to fifty feet above the ground, depending on the aircraft type. Larger, heavier aircraft will be put into the roundout attitude at higher heights than smaller lighter aircraft.
 Flare  The final attitude is the flare which is basically a continuation of the roundout attitude to a slight climb attitude. The objective is to descend at the minimum descent rate and lowest possible forward speed. When performed correctly the aircraft will gently contact the ground at a descent rate of 100 ft/min (30 m/min) or less.
Cruise descent - (on light aircraft) power to 1500rpm - carb heat hot - aim for 90 knots.
Final approach descent - (on light aircraft) 2 stages of flap, when airspeed in the white arc - carb heat hot - aim for 65 knots.
Idle descent - (on light aircraft) power to idle - carb heat hot - aim for 65 knots.
These descents are aimed at light aircraft, and are not applicable to larger and/or multi-engined aircraft.

Aircraft operations